Made in Spain is a merchandise mark indicating that a product IS all planned, manufactured and packed in Spain.

Agriculture

Spain is the biggest exporter of wine and olive oil in the world.

Automobiles

In 2015 Spain produced 2.7 million cars, which made it the 8th largest automobile producer country in the world. The forecast as of 2016 was to produce a total of 2.8 million vehicles, from which about 80% is for export.

References
 

Spain
Business in Spain
Economy of Spain